Balatoni is a surname. Notable people with the surname include:

 Conrad Balatoni (born 1991), English footballer
 Éva Balatoni (born 1957), Hungarian mezzo-soprano
 Kamill Balatoni (1912–1945), Hungarian sprint canoeist
 Levente Balatoni (1910–2000), Hungarian Olympic skier